The 2021 Furman Paladins team represented Furman University as a member of the Southern Conference (SoCon) during the 2021 NCAA Division I FCS football season. Led by fifth-year head coach Clay Hendrix, the Paladins compiled an overall record of 6–5 with a mark of 4–4 in conference play, placing in a three-way tie for fourth in the SoCon. Furman played home games at Paladin Stadium in Greenville, South Carolina.

Schedule

References

Furman
Furman Paladins football seasons
Furman Paladins football